The Tata Punch is a subcompact crossover SUV manufactured by Tata Motors Cars since 2021. Positioned as the smallest SUV of the brand below the Nexon,  the Punch is built on ALFA-ARC platform shared with the Altroz hatchback.

Details 
The concept was revealed as H2X compact SUV (codenamed Hornbill) at the 89th Geneva International Motor Show in 2019, followed by the near-production HBX concept at the Auto Expo 2020. On 23 August 2021, the vehicle was revealed with the name Punch. The car was unveiled on 4 October 2021. It is powered by a 1.2-litre Revotron three-cylinder petrol engine which shared with the Altroz, Tiago, and Tigor.

Safety 

The Tata Punch was crash-tested by Global NCAP in 2021 (similar to Latin NCAP 2013) in its most basic safety specification of two airbags, anti-lock brakes and ISOFIX anchorages. It achieved the maximum five star rating for adult protection, showing a stable passenger compartment in the frontal offset crash, negligible pedal intrusion and no rupture of the footwell. Every body region showed either acceptable or good protection in the frontal crash. The Punch is fitted with a pretensioner even for the lower anchorage of the driver's seatbelt, which helped Tata demonstrate (using a complex Euro NCAP sled test) that sharp structures behind the fascia would not increase risk of injury to the knees of differently sized occupants.

The Punch was also required to pass an ECE regulatory side impact test to achieve the maximum five star rating. The Punch is not fitted with side airbags but could pass the requirements of this minimum regulatory test.

Tata chose to place both child occupants facing rearward, following the latest i-Size recommendations. This helped the Punch achieve a full score for dynamics. However, Global NCAP noted that the Punch offers only a lap belt in the rear centre seat, which limited its score because this type of seatbelt cannot fit a universal child seat. This type of restraint can also seriously injure the spine or abdomen of an adult occupant in a crash.

The Punch does not offer electronic stability control, and it does not offer body or head protecting side airbags.

References

External links 

 Official website

Punch
Cars introduced in 2021
Mini sport utility vehicles
Crossover sport utility vehicles
Front-wheel-drive vehicles
Global NCAP small family cars